A Lady may refer to:

 Jane Austen, who wrote Sense and Sensibility under this name
 George Alexander Stevens, who wrote part of The Female Inquisition under this name
 Eliza Parsons, who wrote Rosetta under this name
 Hannah Maynard Pickard, author who used this name
 The author of The Ladies Library - published by Richard Steele
 Rosalind Lutece, a character in the video game BioShock Infinite
"A Lady", a song by Tally Hall from the 2011 album, Good & Evil

See also

 Lady (disambiguation)
 The Lady (disambiguation)